Norashen (formerly, Bogdanovka) is a town in the Lori Province of Armenia. The town has a museum and nearby is a fort, dated to the 5th–6th century BCE, which has been excavated.

References

World Gazetteer: Armenia – World-Gazetteer.com
Kiesling, Rediscovering Armenia, p. 66, available online at the US embassy to Armenia's website

Populated places in Lori Province